USA Today (stylized in all caps) is an American daily middle-market newspaper and news broadcasting company. Founded by Al Neuharth on September 15, 1982, the newspaper operates from Gannett's corporate headquarters in Tysons, Virginia. Its newspaper is printed at 37 sites across the United States and at five additional sites internationally. The paper's dynamic design influenced the style of local, regional, and national newspapers worldwide through its use of concise reports, colorized images, informational graphics, and inclusion of popular culture stories, among other distinct features.

With an average print circulation of 159,233 as of 2022, a digital-only subscriber base of 504,000 as of 2019, and an approximate daily readership of 2.6 million, USA Today is ranked as the first by circulation on the list of newspapers in the United States. It has been shown to maintain a generally center-left audience, in regards to political persuasion. USA Today is distributed in all 50 states, Washington, D.C., and Puerto Rico, and an international edition is distributed in Asia, Canada, Europe, and the Pacific Islands.

History

USA Today was first conceived on February 29, 1980, when a company task force known as "Project NN" met with then-chairman of Gannett, Al Neuharth, in Cocoa Beach, Florida. Early regional prototypes of USA Today included East Bay Today, an Oakland, California-based publication published in the late 1970s to serve as the morning edition of the Oakland Tribune, an afternoon newspaper which Gannett owned at the time. On June 11, 1981, Gannett printed the first prototypes of the proposed publication. The two proposed design layouts were mailed to newsmakers and prominent leaders in journalism for review and feedback. Gannett's board of directors approved the launch of the national newspaper, titled USA Today, on December 5, 1981. At launch, Neuharth was appointed president and publisher of the newspaper, adding those responsibilities to his existing position as Gannett's chief executive officer.

Gannett announced the launch of the paper on April 20, 1982. USA Today began publishing on September 15, 1982, initially in the Baltimore and Washington, D.C. metropolitan areas, for a newsstand price of 25¢ (equivalent to ¢ in 2020). After selling out the first issue, Gannett gradually expanded the national distribution of the paper, reaching an estimated circulation of 362,879 copies by the end of 1982, double the amount of sales that Gannett projected.

The design uniquely incorporated color graphics and photographs. Initially, only its front news section pages were rendered in four-color, while the remaining pages were printed in a spot color format. The paper's overall style and elevated use of graphics – developed by Neuharth, in collaboration with staff graphics designers George Rorick, Sam Ward, Suzy Parker, John Sherlock and Web Bryant – was derided by critics, who referred to it as a "McPaper" or "television you can wrap fish in", because it opted to incorporate concise nuggets of information more akin to the style of television news, rather than in-depth stories like traditional newspapers, which many in the newspaper industry considered to be a dumbing down of content. Although USA Today had been profitable for just ten years as of 1997, it changed the appearance and feel of newspapers around the world.

On July 2, 1984, the newspaper switched from predominantly black-and-white to full-color photography and graphics in all four sections. The following week, on July 10, USA Today launched an international edition intended for U.S. readers abroad, followed four months later on October 8 with the rollout of the first transmission via satellite of its international version to Singapore. On April 8, 1985, the paper published its first special bonus section, a 12-page section called "Baseball '85", which previewed the 1985 Major League Baseball season.

By the fourth quarter of 1985, USA Today had become the second-largest newspaper in the United States, reaching a daily circulation of 1.4 million copies. Total daily readership of the paper by 1987 (according to Simmons Market Research Bureau statistics) had reached 5.5 million, the largest of any daily newspaper in the U.S. On May 6, 1986, USA Today began production of its international edition in Switzerland. USA Today operated at a loss for most of its first four years of operation, accumulating a total deficit of $233 million after taxes, according to figures released by Gannett in July 1987; the newspaper began turning its first profit in May 1987, six months ahead of Gannett corporate revenue projections.

On January 29, 1988, USA Today published the largest edition in its history, a 78-page weekend edition featuring a section previewing Super Bowl XXII; the edition included 44.38 pages of advertising and sold 2,114,055 copies, setting a single-day record for an American newspaper (and surpassed seven months later on September 2, when its Labor Day weekend edition sold 2,257,734 copies). On April 15, USA Today launched a third international printing site, based in Hong Kong. The international edition set circulation and advertising records during August 1988, with coverage of the 1988 Summer Olympics, selling more than 60,000 copies and 100 pages of advertising.

By July 1991, Simmons Market Research Bureau estimated that USA Today had a total daily readership of nearly 6.6 million, an all-time high and the largest readership of any daily newspaper in the United States. On September 1, 1991, USA Today launched a fourth printsite for its international edition in London for the United Kingdom and the British Isles. The international edition's schedule was changed as of April 1, 1994, to Monday through Friday, rather than from Tuesday through Saturday, in order to accommodate business travelers; on February 1, 1995, USA Today opened its first editorial bureau outside the United States at its Hong Kong publishing facility; additional editorial bureaus were launched in London and Moscow in 1996.

On April 17, 1995, USA Today launched its website to provide real-time news coverage; in June 2002 the site expanded to include a section providing travel information and booking tools. On August 28, 1995, a fifth international publishing site was launched in Frankfurt, Germany, to print and distribute the international edition throughout most of Europe.

On October 4, 1999, USA Today began running advertisements on its front page for the first time. In 2017, some pages of USA Today's website features Auto-Play functionality for video or audio-aided stories.

On February 8, 2000, Gannett launched USA Today Live, a broadcast and Internet initiative designed to provide coverage from the newspaper to broadcast television stations nationwide for use in their local newscasts and their websites; the venture also provided integration with the USA Today website, which transitioned from a text-based format to feature audio and video clips of news content.

The paper launched a sixth printing site for its international edition on May 15, 2000, in Milan, Italy, followed on July 10 by the launch of an international printing facility in Charleroi, Belgium.

In 2001, two interactive units were launched: on June 19, USA Today and Gannett Newspapers launched the USA Today Careers Network (now Careers.com), a website featuring localized employment listings, then on July 18, the USA Today News Center was launched as an interactive television news service developed through a joint venture with the On Command Corporation that was distributed to hotels around the United States. On September 12 of that year, the newspaper set an all-time single day circulation record, selling 3,638,600 copies for its edition covering the September 11 attacks. That November, USA Today migrated its operations from Gannett's previous corporate headquarters in Arlington, Virginia, to the company's new headquarters in nearby McLean.

In 2004, Jack Kelley, a senior foreign correspondent for USA Today, was found to have fabricated foreign news reports over the past decade. Kelley resigned.

On December 12, 2005, Gannett announced that it would combine the separate newsroom operations of the online and print entities of USA Today, with USAToday.com's vice president and editor-in-chief Kinsey Wilson promoted to co-executive editor, alongside existing executive editor John Hillkirk.

In December 2010, USA Today launched the USA Today API for sharing data with partners of all types.

Newsroom restructuring and 2011 graphical tweaks
On August 27, 2010, USA Today announced that it would undergo a reorganization of its newsroom, announcing the layoffs of 130 staffers. It also announced that the paper would shift its focus away from print and place more emphasis on its digital platforms (including USAToday.com and its related mobile applications) and launch of a new publication called USA Today Sports.

On January 24, 2011, to reverse a revenue slide, the paper introduced a tweaked format that modified the appearance of its front section pages, which included a larger logo at the top of each page; coloring tweaks to section front pages; a new sans-serif font, called Prelo, for certain headlines of main stories (replacing the Gulliver typeface that had been implemented for story headers in April 2000); an updated "Newsline" feature featuring larger, "newsier" headline entry points; and the increasing and decreasing of mastheads and white space to present a cleaner style.

2012 redesign

On September 14, 2012, USA Today underwent the first major redesign in its history, in commemoration for the 30th anniversary of the paper's first edition. Developed in conjunction with brand design firm Wolff Olins, the print edition of USA Today added a page covering technology stories and expanded travel coverage within the Life section and increased the number of color pages included in each edition, while retaining longtime elements. The "globe" logo used since the paper's inception was replaced with a new logo featuring a large circle rendered in colors corresponding to each of the sections, serving as an infographic that changes with news stories, containing images representing that day's top stories.

The paper's website was also extensively overhauled using a new, in-house content management system known as Presto and a design created by Fantasy Interactive, that incorporates flipboard-style navigation to switch between individual stories (which obscure most of the main and section pages), clickable video advertising and a responsive design layout. The site was designed and developed to be more interactive, faster, provide "high impact" advertising units (known as Gravity), and provide the ability for Gannett to syndicate USA Today content to the websites of its local properties, and vice versa. To accomplish this goal, Gannett Digital migrated its newspaper and television station websites to the Presto platform. Developers built a separate platform to provide optimizations for mobile and touchscreen devices. The Gravity ad won Digiday's Best Publishing Innovation in Advertising in 2016, thanks to an 80% full-watch user engagement rate on desktop, and 96% on mobile.

Following the relaunch, the editorial team behind USA Today Investigations ramped up its "longread" article plans, following the success of the series Ghost Factories. With differing platform requirements, USA Today's mobile website did not offer any specialized support for these multi-chapter stories. Nearing the end of 2012, more than one-third of USA Todays readership was browsing only using their mobile phones, and the majority of these users were accessing the mobile website (as opposed to the iOS and Android applications) with the newer, less-obtrusive advertising strategy. Gannet Digital designed, developed, and released the longread mobile experience to coincide with the launch of Brad Heath's series Locked Up, which won the Investigative Reporters and Editors Tom Renner Award in October 2013.

Gannett Digital's focus on its mobile content experience paid off in 2012 with multiple awards; including the Eppy for Best Mobile Application, the Mobile Excellence award for Best User Experience, the MOBI award for Editorial Content, and Mobile Publisher of the Year.

The USA Today site design was launched on desktop, mobile and TV throughout 2013 and 2014, although archive content accessible through search engines remains available through the pre-relaunch design.

Mid-2010s expansion and restructuring
On October 6, 2013, Gannett test launched a condensed daily edition of USA Today (part of what was internally known within Gannett as the "Butterfly" initiative) for distribution as an insert in four of its newspapers – The Indianapolis Star, the Rochester Democrat & Chronicle, the Fort Myers-based The News-Press and the Appleton, Wisconsin-based The Post-Crescent. The launch of the syndicated insert caused USA Today to restructure its operations to allow seven-day-a-week production to accommodate the packaging of its national and international news content and enterprise stories (comprising about 10 pages for the weekday and Saturday editions, and up to 22 pages for the Sunday edition) into the pilot insert. Gannett later announced on December 11, that it would formally launch the condensed daily edition of USA Today in 31 additional local newspapers nationwide through April 2014 (with the Palm Springs, California-based The Desert Sun and the Lafayette, Louisiana-based Advertiser being the first newspapers outside of the pilot program participants to add the supplement on December 15), citing "positive feedback" to the feature from readers and advertisers of the initial four papers. Gannett was given permission from the Alliance for Audited Media to count the circulation figures from the syndicated local insert with the total circulation count for the flagship national edition of USA Today.

On January 4, 2014, USA Today acquired the consumer product review website Reviewed. In the first quarter of 2014, Gannett launched a condensed USA Today insert into 31 other newspapers in its network, thereby increasing the number of inserts to 35, in an effort to shore up circulation after it regained its position as the highest-circulated week daily newspaper in the United States in October 2013. On September 3, 2014, USA Today announced that it would lay off roughly 70 employees in a restructuring of its newsroom and business operations. In October 2014, USA Today and OpenWager Inc. entered into a partnership to release a Bingo mobile app called USA TODAY Bingo Cruise.

On December 3, 2015, Gannett formally launched the USA Today Network, a national digital newsgathering service providing shared content between USA Today and the company's 92 local newspapers throughout the United States as well as pooling advertising services on both a hyperlocal and national reach. The Louisville Courier-Journal had earlier soft-launched the service as part of a pilot program started on November 17, coinciding with an imaging rebrand for the Louisville, Kentucky-based newspaper; Gannett's other local newspaper properties, as well as those it acquired through its merger with the Journal Media Group, gradually began identifying themselves as part of the USA Today Network (foregoing use of the Gannett name outside of requisite ownership references) through early January 2016.

In May 2021, USA Today introduced a paywall for some of its online stories.

On June 16, 2022, it was reported that USA Today removed 23 articles written by journalist Gabriela Miranda after an inquiry related to one of her articles triggered an internal investigation and found that Miranda had fabricated sources on articles pertaining to the Texas Heartbeat Act, Ukrainian women's issues due to the Russian invasion, and an article on sunscreen. Miranda resigned.

Layout and format

USA Today is known for synthesizing news down to easy-to-read-and-comprehend stories. In the main edition circulated in the United States and Canada, each edition consists of four sections: News (the oft-labeled "front page" section), Money, Sports, and Life. Since March 1998, the Friday edition of Life has been separated into two distinct sections: the regular Life focusing on entertainment (subtitled Weekend; section E), which features television reviews and listings, a DVD column, film reviews and trends, and a travel supplement called Destinations & Diversions (section D). The international edition of the paper features two sections: News and Money in one; with Sports and Life in the other.

Atypical of most daily newspapers, the paper does not print on Saturdays and Sundays; the Friday edition serves as the weekend edition. USA Today has published special Saturday and Sunday editions in the past: the first issue released during the standard calendar weekend was published on January 19, 1991, when it released a Saturday "Extra" edition updating coverage of the Gulf War from the previous day; the paper published special seven-day-a-week editions for the first time on July 19, 1996, when it published special editions for exclusive distribution in the host city of Atlanta and surrounding areas for the two-week duration of the 1996 Summer Olympics. USA Today prints each complete story on the front page of the respective section with the exception of the cover story. The cover story is a longer story that requires a jump (readers must turn to another page in the paper to complete the story, usually the next page of that section). On certain days, the news or sports section will take up two paper sections, and there will be a second cover story within the second section.

Each section is denoted by a certain color to differentiate sections beyond lettering and is seen in a box the top-left corner of the first page; the principal section colors are blue for News (section A), green for Money (section B), red for Sports (section C), and purple for Life (section D); in the paper's early years, the Life and Money sections were also assigned blue nameplates and spot color, as the presses used at USA Today printing facilities did not yet accommodate the use of other colors to denote all four original sections. Orange is used for bonus sections (section E or above), which are published occasionally such as for business travel trends and the Olympics; other bonus sections for sports (such as for the PGA Tour preview, NCAA basketball tournaments, Memorial Day auto races (Indianapolis 500 and Coca-Cola 600), NFL opening weekend and the Super Bowl) previously used the orange color, but now use the red designated for sports in their bonus sections. To increase their ties to USA Today, Gannett incorporated the USA Today coloring scheme into an internally created graphics package for news programming that the company began phasing in across its television station group – which were spun-off in July 2015 into the separate broadcast and digital media company Tegna – in late 2012 (the package utilizes the color scheme for a rundown graphic used on most stations – outside those that Gannett acquired in 2014 from London Broadcasting, which began implementing the package in late 2015 – that persists throughout its stations' newscasts, as well as bumpers for individual story topics). Gannett's television stations began to a new on-air appearance that uses a color-coding system identical to that of the paper.

In many ways, USA Today is set up to break the typical newspaper layout. Some examples of that divergence from tradition include using the left-hand quarter of each section as reefers (front-page paragraphs referring to stories on inside pages), sometimes using sentence-length blurbs to describe stories inside; the lead reefer is the cover page feature "Newsline", which shows summarized descriptions of headline stories featured in all four main sections and any special sections. As a national newspaper, USA Today cannot focus on the weather for any one city. Therefore, the entire back page of the News section is used for weather maps for the continental United States, Puerto Rico and the U.S. Virgin Islands, and temperature lists for many cities throughout the U.S. and the world (temperatures for individual cities on the primary forecast map and temperature lists are suffixed with a one- or two-letter code, such as "t" for thunderstorms, referencing the expected weather conditions); the colorized forecast map, originally created by staff designer George Rorick (who left USA Today for a similar position at The Detroit News in 1986), was copied by newspapers around the world, breaking from the traditional style of using monochrome contouring or simplistic text to denote temperature ranges. National precipitation maps for the next three days (previously five days until the 2012 redesign), and four-day forecasts and air quality indexes for 36 major U.S. cities (originally 16 cities prior to 1999) – with individual cities color-coded by the temperature contour corresponding to the given area on the forecast map – are also featured. Weather data is provided by AccuWeather, which has served as the forecast provider for USA Today for most of the paper's existence (with an exception from January 2002 to September 2012, during which forecast data was provided by The Weather Channel through a long-term multimedia content agreement with Gannett). In the bottom left-hand corner of the weather page is "Weather Focus", a graphic which explains various meteorological phenomena. On some days, the Weather Focus could be a photo of a rare meteorological event.

On Mondays, the Money section uses its back page for "Market Trends", a feature that launched in June 2002 and presents an unusual graphic depicting the performance of various industry groups as a function of quarterly, monthly, and weekly movements against the S&P 500. On business holidays or days when bonus sections are included in the issue, the Money and Life sections are usually combined into one section, while combinations of the Friday Life editions into one section are common during quiet weeks. Advertising coverage is seen in the Monday Money section, which often includes a review of a current television ad, and after Super Bowl Sunday, a review of the ads aired during the broadcast with the results of the Ad Track live survey. Stock tables for individual stock exchanges (comprising one subsection for companies traded on the New York Stock Exchange, and another for companies trading on NASDAQ and the American Stock Exchange) and mutual indexes were discontinued with the 2012 redesign due to the myriad of electronic ways to check individual stock prices, in line with most newspapers.

Book coverage, including reviews and a national sales chart (the latter of which debuted on October 28, 1994), is seen on Thursdays in Life, with the official full A.C. Nielsen television ratings chart printed on Wednesdays or Thursdays, depending on release. The paper also publishes the Mediabase survey for several genres of music, based on radio airplay spins on Tuesdays, along with their own chart of the top ten singles in general on Wednesdays. Because of the same limitations cited for its nationalized forecasts, the television page in Life – which provides prime time and late night listings (running from 8:00 p.m. to 12:30 a.m. Eastern Time) – incorporates boilerplate "Local news" or "Local programming" descriptions to denote time periods in which the five major English language broadcast networks (ABC, NBC, CBS, Fox and The CW) cede airtime to allow their owned and affiliated stations to carry syndicated programs or local newscasts; the television page has never been accompanied by a weekly listings supplement with broader scheduling information similar to those featured in local newspapers. Like most national papers, USA Today does not carry comic strips.

One of the staples of the News section is "Across the USA", a state-by-state roundup of headlines. The summaries consist of paragraph-length Associated Press reports highlighting one story of note in each state, the District of Columbia, and one U.S. territory. Similarly, the "For the Record" page of the Sports section (which features sports scores for both the previous four days of league play and individual non-league events, seasonal league statistics and wagering lines for the current day's games) previously featured a rundown of winning numbers from the previous deadline date for all participating state lotteries and individual multi-state lotteries.

Some traditions have been retained. The lead story still appears on the upper-right hand of the front page. Commentary and political cartoons occupy the last few pages of the News section. Stock and mutual fund data are presented in the Money section. But USA Today is sufficiently different in aesthetics to be recognized on sight, even in a mix of other newspapers, such as at a newsstand. The overall design and layout of USA Today has been described as neo-Victorian.

Also, in most of the sections' front pages, on the lower left-hand corner, are "USA Today Snapshots", which give statistics of various lifestyle interests according to the section it is in (for example, a snapshot in "Life" could show how many people tend to watch a certain genre of television show based upon the type of mood they are in at the time). These "Snapshots" are shown through graphs that are made up of various illustrations of objects that roughly pertain to the graphs subject matter (using the example above, the graph's bars could be made up of several TV sets, or ended by one). These are usually loosely based on research by a national institute (with the credited source mentioned in fine print in the box below the graph).

The newspaper also features an occasional magazine supplement called Open Air, which launched on March 7, 2008, and appears several times a year. Various other advertorials appear throughout the year, mainly on Fridays.

Opinion section
The opinion section prints USA Today editorials, columns by guest writers and members of the editorial board of Contributors, letters to the editor, and editorial cartoons. One unique feature of the USA Today editorial page is the publication of opposing points of view; alongside the editorial board's piece on the day's topic runs an opposing view by a guest writer, often an expert in the field. The opinion pieces featured in each edition are decided by the Board of Contributors, which are separate from the paper's news staff.

From 1999 to 2002 and from 2004 to 2015, the editorial page editor was Brian Gallagher, who has worked for the newspaper since its founding in 1982. Other members of the editorial board included deputy editorial page editor Bill Sternberg, executive forum editor John Siniff, op-ed/forum page editor Glen Nishimura, operations editor Thuan Le Elston, letters editor Michelle Poblete, web content editor Eileen Rivers, and editorial writers Dan Carney, George Hager, and Saundra Torry. The newspaper's website calls this group "demographically and ideologically diverse."

Beginning with the 1984 United States presidential election, USA Today had traditionally maintained a policy not to endorse candidates for the President of the United States or any other state or federal political office, which has been since re-evaluated by the paper's Board of Contributors through an independent process during each four-year election cycle, with any decision to circumvent the policy based on a consensus vote in which fewer than two of the editorial board's members dissent or hold differing opinions. For most of its history, the paper's political editorials (most of them linked to the then-current Presidential election cycle) had focused instead on providing opinion on major issues based on the differing concerns of voters, the vast amount of information on these themes, and the board's aim to provide a fair viewpoint through the diverse political ideologies of its members and avoid reader perceptions of bias.

Such avoidance of doing political editorials played a great part in USA Today's long-standing reputation for "fluff", but after its 30th anniversary revamp, the paper took a more active stance on political issues, calling for stronger gun laws after the Sandy Hook Elementary School shooting in 2012. It heavily criticized the Republican Party for both the 2013 government shutdown and the 2015 revolts in the United States House of Representatives that ended with the resignation of John Boehner as House Speaker. It also called out then-President Barack Obama and other top members of the Democratic Party for what they perceived as "inaction" over several issues during 2013–14, particularly over the NSA scandal and the ISIL beheading incidents.

The editorial board broke from the "non-endorsement" policy for the first time on September 29, 2016, when it published an op-ed piece condemning the candidacy of Republican nominee Donald Trump, calling him "unfit for the presidency" due to his inflammatory campaign rhetoric (particularly that aimed at the press, with certain media organizations being openly targeted and even banned from campaign rallies, including The New York Times, The Washington Post, CNN and the BBC, military veterans who had been prisoners of war, including 2008 Republican presidential candidate and Vietnam War veteran John McCain, immigrants, and various ethnic and religious groups); his temperament and lack of financial transparency; his "checkered" business record; his use of false and hyperbolic statements; the inconsistency of his viewpoints and issues with his vision on domestic and foreign policy; and, based on comments he had made during his campaign and criticisms by both Democrats and Republicans on these views, the potential risks to national security and constitutional ethics under a Trump administration, asking voters to "resist the siren song of a dangerous demagogue". The board noted that the piece was not a "qualified endorsement" of Democratic nominee Hillary Clinton, for whom the board was unable to reach a consensus for endorsing (some editorial board members expressed that Clinton's public service record would help her "serve the nation ably as its president", while others had "serious reservations about [her] sense of entitlement, [...] lack of candor and [...] extreme carelessness in handling classified information"), endorsing instead tactical voting against Trump and GOP seats in swing states, advising voters to decide whether to vote for either Clinton, Libertarian nominee Gary Johnson, Green Party nominee Jill Stein or a write-in candidate for president; or focus on Senate, House and other down-ballot political races.

In February 2018, USA Today published an op-ed by Jerome Corsi, the DC bureau chief for the fringe conspiracy website InfoWars. Corsi, a prominent conspiracy theorist, was described by USA Today as an "author" and "investigative journalist". Corsi was a prominent proponent of the false conspiracy theory that Barack Obama was not a US citizen, and Infowars has promoted conspiracy theories such as 9/11 being an "inside job."

In October 2018, USA Today was criticized by NBC News for publishing an editorial by President Trump that was replete with inaccuracies. The Washington Post fact-checker said that "almost every sentence contained a misleading statement or a falsehood."

In 2020, USA Today endorsed a specific presidential candidate for the first time, Democratic nominee Joe Biden. The newspaper also published an opposing editorial by Vice President Mike Pence, which called for his and Trump's re-election.

Personnel

In May 2012, Larry Kramer – a 40-year media industry veteran and former president of CBS Digital Media – was appointed president and publisher of USA Today, replacing David Hunke, who had been publisher of the newspaper since 2009. Kramer was tasked with developing a new strategy for the paper as it sought to increase revenue from its digital operations.

In July 2012, Kramer hired David Callaway – whom the former had hired as lead editor of MarketWatch in 1999, two years after Kramer founded the website – as the paper's editor-in-chief. Callaway had previously worked at Bloomberg News covering the banking, investment-banking and asset-management businesses throughout Europe and at the Boston Herald, where he co-wrote a daily financial column on "comings and goings in the Boston business district".

The current Editor-in-Chief is Nicole Carroll, who has served since February 2018.

Related publications and services

USA WeekendUSA Weekend was a sister publication that launched in 1953 as Family Weekly, a national Sunday magazine supplement intended for the Sunday editions of various U.S. newspapers; it adopted its final title following Gannett's purchase of the magazine in 1985. The magazine – which was distributed to approximately 800 newspapers nationwide at its peak with most Gannett-owned local newspapers carrying it by default within their Sunday editions – focused primarily on social issues, entertainment, health, food and travel. On December 5, 2014, Gannett announced that it would cease publishing USA Weekend after the December 26–28, 2014 edition, citing increasing operational costs and reduced advertising revenue, with most of its participating newspapers choosing to replace it with competing Sunday magazine Parade.

USA Today Sports WeeklyUSA Today Sports Weekly is a weekly magazine that covers news and statistics from Major League Baseball, Minor League Baseball and NCAA baseball, the National Football League (NFL) and NASCAR. It was first published on April 5, 1991, as USA Today Baseball Weekly, a tabloid-sized baseball-focused publication released on Wednesdays, on a weekly basis during the baseball season and bi-weekly during the off-season; the magazine expanded its sports coverage on September 4, 2002, when it adopted its current title after added stories about the NFL. Sports Weekly added coverage of NASCAR on February 15, 2006, lasting only during that year's race season; and added coverage of NCAA college football on August 8, 2007. The editorial operations of Sports Weekly originally operated autonomously from USA Today, before being integrated with the newspaper's sports department in late 2005.

The Big LeadThe Big Lead''' is a sports blog operated by USA Today that was launched in February 2006 by original owner Fantasy Sports Ventures (co-founded by Jason McIntyre and David Lessa), which was purchased by Gannett – which, beginning in April 2008, had maintained a strategic content and marketing partnership with the former company – in January 2012. The site – which is usually updated on a routine basis of 10 to 15 times per day between 8:00 a.m. and 6:00 p.m. Eastern Time – mainly covers sports, but also provides news and commentary on other news topics, ranging from politics to pop culture.

USA Today: The Television Show
In 1987, Gannett and producer/former NBC CEO Grant Tinker began developing a news magazine series for broadcast syndication that attempted to bring the breezy style of USA Today to television. The result was USA Today: The Television Show (later retitled USA Today on TV, then shortened to simply USA Today), which premiered on September 12, 1988. Correspondents on the program included Edie Magnus, Robin Young, Boyd Matson, Kenneth Walker, Dale Harimoto, Ann Abernathy, Bill Macatee and Beth Ruyak. As with the newspaper itself, the show was divided into four "sections" corresponding to the different parts of the paper: News (focusing on the major headlines of the day), Money (focusing on financial news and consumer reports), Sports (focusing on sports news and scores) and Life (focusing on entertainment and lifestyle-related stories). The series was distributed to syndication by GTG Marketing, another subsidiary of GTG Entertainment, which sold it as a prime access magazine show, hoping most stations would air it in a prime access time slot for syndication.

The series was plagued by low ratings and negative reviews from critics throughout its run. The program also suffered from being scheduled in undesirable timeslots in certain markets; this was a particular case in New York City, the country's largest media market, where CBS owned-and-operated station WCBS-TV (channel 2) aired the program in a pre-dawn early morning slot, before the program was picked up by NBC O&O WNBC five months into its run; after initially airing it in an equally undesirable 5:30 a.m. slot, the series was later moved to a more palatable 9:30 a.m. time period, but still did not fare any better on its new station (in contrast, CITY-DT in Toronto, Ontario, Canada [now the flagship of the Citytv television network], ran it at 5:00 p.m.). Although the series was renewed for a second season, these setbacks led to the mid-season cancellation of the TV version of USA Today in November 1989, after one-and-a-half seasons; the final edition aired on January 7, 1990.

Gannett announced plans to develop a USA Today-branded weekly half-hour television program, to have been titled Sports Page, as part of a renewed initiative to extend the brand into television; this program, which was tapped for a fall 2004 debut, ultimately never launched.

VRtually ThereVRtually There was a weekly virtual reality news program produced by the USA Today Network, which debuted on October 20, 2016. The program, which was available on the USA Today mobile app and is still available on YouTube, showcased three original segments outlining news stories through a first-person perspective, recorded and produced by journalists from USA Today and its co-owned local newspapers. The program also incorporated "cubemercials", long-form advertisements created by Gannett's in-house creative studio GET Creative, which are designed to allow consumer engagement in fully immersive experiences through virtual reality. The last story was uploaded on August 1, 2017, less than a year after the creation of the series.

For the WinUSA Today also publishes a sports website called For the Win.

Awards
 USA Today Minor League Player of the Year Award – First presented in 1988, this annual award has been given to a particular Minor league baseball player judged to have had the most outstanding season by a thirteen-person panel of baseball experts.
 USA Today All-USA high school baseball team – First presented in 1998, the award honors between nine and eleven outstanding baseball players from high schools around the United States to be part on the team (separate awards honoring the High School Baseball Player of the Year and High School Baseball Coach of the Year have been given since 1989).
 USA Today All-USA high school basketball team – First presented in 1983, the award honors outstanding male and female basketball players from high schools around the United States with a place on the team, with one member of each team being named as the High School Basketball Player of the Year as well as coaches from a select boys' and girls' team as the High School Basketball Coach of the Year.
 USA Today All-Joe Team (NFL) – First presented in 1992 in tribute to Kansas City Chiefs veteran defensive lineman Joe Phillips, the award honors 52 rookie players from throughout the NFL for their exemplary performance during the previous league season.
 USA Today/National Prep Poll High School Football National Championship – Predating the first publication of USA Today under the sole decision of the National Prep Poll, it is a national championship honor awarded to the best high school football team(s) in the United States, based on rankings decided by the newspaper's sports editorial department.
 USA Today All-USA high school football team – First presented in 1982, the award honors outstanding football players from high schools around the United States (includes ranks for the Super 25 teams in the U.S. and Top 10 teams in the East, South, Midwest and West, and USA Today High School Football Player of the Year).
 USA Today High School Football Coach of the Year – First presented in 1982, the award awards a coach from one of the teams selected for the All-USA football team for the honor.
 USA TODAY Road Warrior of the Year first presented to Joyce Gioia in 2013; never presented again.

In popular culture

 A futuristic 2015 edition of USA Today (Hill Valley edition) is seen in the film Back to the Future Part II (1989). As a tribute to the movie, the newspaper ran a recreation of the front page, featuring the exact headlines portrayed in the movie (except for a piece mentioning a future state visit by "Queen Diana", the Princess having died in 1997), on October 22, 2015, when the protagonist Marty McFly (played by Michael J. Fox) travels to October 21, 2015, and reads the following day's edition of the paper.
 A 1991 episode of The Simpsons'' ("Homer Defined") featured a parody of the paper ("U.S. of A. News"), whose lead story was "#2 is #1", in reference to pencils. Lisa criticizes the paper's blandness, but Homer retorts that "Hey, this is the only paper in America that's not afraid to tell the truth, that everything is just fine."

See also
 USA Today Super Bowl Ad Meter
 Viewtron
 :Category:USA Today journalists

References

Further reading

External links

 

 
Companies based in McLean, Virginia
Gannett publications
National newspapers published in the United States
Publications established in 1982
Daily newspapers published in the United States
1982 establishments in the United States
Universal Windows Platform apps
Daily newspapers published in Virginia
First-run syndicated television programs in the United States
1988 American television series debuts
1990 American television series endings
1980s American television news shows
1990s American television news shows
English-language television shows
Entertainment news shows in the United States
Pulitzer Prize for Explanatory Journalism winners
Podcasting companies